Hossam Arafat may refer to:
Hossam Arafat (footballer) (born 1990), Egyptian footballer
Hossam Arafat (politician), Palestinian politician